Masters W70 discus world record progression is the progression of world record improvements of the discus W70 division of Masters athletics.  Records must be set in properly conducted, official competitions under the standing IAAF rules unless modified by World Masters Athletics.

The W70 division consists of female athletes who have reached the age of 70 but have not yet reached the age of 75, so exactly from their 70th birthday to the day before their 75th birthday. The W70 division throws exactly the same 1 kg implement as the Open division.

Key

References

Masters Athletics Discus list

Masters athletics world record progressions
Discus